Velikonja is a Slovene surname. Notable people with the surname include:

Etien Velikonja (born 1988), professional soccer player
Joseph Velikonja (1923–2015), Slovene-American geographer
Narte Velikonja (1891–1945), Slovene writer and cultural figure

Slovene-language surnames